Volo is a village in Lake County, Illinois,  United States. It was incorporated as a village on April 26, 1993. Per the 2020 census, the population was 6,122.

Geography
Volo is located at  (42.331047, -88.160975).

Major streets
  US Route 12
  Illinois Route 59
  Illinois Route 60
  Illinois Route 120 (Belvidere Road)
 Nippersink Road
 Molidor Road
 Fish Lake Road
 Gilmer Road
 Sullivan Lake Road
 Fox Lake Road
 Volo Village Road

Demographics

2020 census

Note: the US Census treats Hispanic/Latino as an ethnic category. This table excludes Latinos from the racial categories and assigns them to a separate category. Hispanics/Latinos can be of any race.

2000 Census
As of the census of 2000, there were 180 people, 52 households, and 39 families residing in the village. There were 61 housing units at an average density of 21.9 per square mile (8.4/km). The racial makeup of the village was 92.78% White, 1.11% Asian, 0.56% from other races, and 5.56% from two or more races. Hispanic or Latino of any race were 23.33% of the population.

There were 52 households, out of which 32.7% had children under the age of 18 living with them, 55.8% were married couples living together, 13.5% had a female householder with no husband present, and 23.1% were non-families. 13.5% of all households were made up of individuals, and 7.7% had someone living alone who was 65 years of age or older. The average household size was 3.08 and the average family size was 3.33.

In the village, the population was spread out, with 22.8% under the age of 18, 10.6% from 18 to 24, 33.3% from 25 to 44, 21.7% from 45 to 64, and 11.7% who were 65 years of age or older. The median age was 34 years. For every 100 females, there were 127.8 males. For every 100 females age 18 and over, there were 120.6 males.

The median income for a household in the village was $45,833, and the median income for a family was $45,625. Males had a median income of $33,750 versus $36,250 for females. The per capita income for the village was $22,791. About 13.5% of families and 33.0% of the population were below the poverty line, including 55.1% of those under the age of eighteen and 33.3% of those 65 or over.

Institutions and parks 
Volo contains the Volo Auto Museum and is located near the Volo Bog State Natural Area (which is just outside the village boundary), which was the first purchase of the Illinois Nature Conservancy.  Cyrus Mark, the first president of the Illinois Nature Conservancy, spearheaded the effort to purchase Volo Bog for preservation. Cyrus was the son of steel magnate Clayton Mark, the builder of the planned worker community named Marktown.

The current mayor is Stephen Henley. Bonnie Rydberg is the clerk.

References

External links
Village of Volo official website

Villages in Illinois
Villages in Lake County, Illinois
Populated places established in 1993
1993 establishments in Illinois